Francis Nimmo (born 1971) is a Professor of Planetary Science at the University of California Santa Cruz.

Biography

Education
Nimmo attended Wolverhampton Grammar School and received his Bachelor of Arts degree in Geological Sciences from St John's College, Cambridge University, in 1993 and completed his Ph.D. on Volcanism and Tectonics on Venus from Cambridge in 1996.

Career
His research focuses on the origin and evolution of solid body surfaces and interiors from observations and geophysical modelling. Some of his research achievements include his showing that a giant impact could have generated the Martian hemispheric dichotomy, identification of shear-heating as an important process on Enceladus, Europa and Triton and the explanation of the link between plate tectonics and dynamo activity on Mars and Venus.

Awards and honors
 2001: President's Award of the Geological Society
 2001: Royal Society University Research Fellowship
 2007: James B. Macelwane Medal of the American Geophysical Union
 2007: Nimmo received the Harold C. Urey Prize of the Division for Planetary Sciences  
 2011: Japan Society for the Promotion of Science (JSPS) Visiting Fellow
 2018: He is a recipient of the 2018 Paolo Farinella Prize. 
 2018: Asteroid 175920 Francisnimmo was named in his honor. The official  was published by the Minor Planet Center on 25 September 2018.
 2019: He receives the 2019 Harold Jeffreys Lectureship of the RAS. 
 2020: Nimmo elected to the US National Academy of Sciences

References

External links
 Francis Nimmo's Homepage at UC Santa Cruz

Living people
1971 births
Alumni of St John's College, Cambridge
Planetary scientists